Alexandra Wojcik (born 5 March 1985 in Lębork) is a Polish group rhythmic gymnast representing her nation at international competitions.  She participated at the 2004 Summer Olympics in the all-around event together with Justyna Banasiak, Martyna Dąbkowska, Małgorzata Ławrynowicz, Anna Mrozińska and Aleksandra Zawistowska finishing 10th. She competed at world championships, including at the 2005, 2007, 2009, 2010 and 2011  World Rhythmic Gymnastics Championships.

References

1985 births
Living people
Polish rhythmic gymnasts
People from Lębork
Sportspeople from Pomeranian Voivodeship
Olympic gymnasts of Poland
Gymnasts at the 2004 Summer Olympics